Sphagesauridae is a Gondwanan family of mesoeucrocodylians that lived during the Late Cretaceous. It was a clade of terrestrial crocodilians that evolved very mammal-like teeth and jaws. Both Sphagesaurus and Adamantinasuchus are known from the Turonian to Santonian of Brazil.

References

Late Cretaceous crocodylomorphs
Terrestrial crocodylomorphs
Late Cretaceous first appearances
Late Cretaceous extinctions
 
Prehistoric reptile families